Steven Leslie Wignall (born 17 September 1954) is an English former professional football manager and player. During his playing career, Wignall, who played as a central defender, made over 600 appearances in the Football League.

Playing career
Born in Liverpool, Wignall played professionally for Doncaster Rovers, Colchester United, Brentford and Aldershot, making a total of 639 appearances in the Football League. He retired as a player in 1991, barely a year before Aldershot went out of business.

Coaching career
After his retirement from playing he joined the coaching staff at Aldershot, before assisting Ian McDonald. After Aldershot went out of business in 1992, a new club, Aldershot Town was formed, and Wignall became their first ever manager, winning back to back promotions before former club Colchester United signed him in January 1995. During his time at Colchester he led the club to promotion via the play-offs in 1997/98 and to the final of the Associate Members' Cup the year before. He stayed as manager until he resigned in January 1999, believing he had taken the club as far as he could. In April 2000, he joined Stevenage Borough and was offered a two-year contract but never signed it and, when approached a month later by former club Doncaster Rovers, he decided to manage them instead, having only managed 8 games at Stevenage. He managed Doncaster for just one season. In 2003, he became manager of Southend United but only lasted seven months. He also worked as a first team coach and assistant at Wivenhoe Town from 2005 before leaving club due to financial reasons in January 2008.

In 2009, Wignall published his autobiography titled You Can Have Chips.

Managerial statistics

Honours

As a player
Brentford
 Associate Members' Cup runner-up: 1984–85

Aldershot
 Football League Fourth Division playoff: 1986–87

As a manager
Aldershot Town
 Isthmian League Division Three: 1992–93

Colchester United
 Football League Trophy runner-up: 1996–97
 Football League Third Division playoff: 1997–98

References

External links

Profile at Doncaster Rovers F.C. official website
Profile at Aldershot Town official website

1954 births
Living people
English footballers
English football managers
Liverpool F.C. players
Doncaster Rovers F.C. players
Colchester United F.C. players
Brentford F.C. players
Aldershot F.C. players
English Football League players
Aldershot Town F.C. managers
Colchester United F.C. managers
Stevenage F.C. managers
Doncaster Rovers F.C. managers
Southend United F.C. managers
English Football League managers
Association football defenders
English autobiographers